Stéphane Venne (born July 2, 1941 in Verdun, Quebec) is a French-Canadian songwriter and composer. He also worked as head of production for the Canadian arm of Barclay Records and as a radio station executive. He composed music for several films, including The Plouffe Family (Les Plouffe).

As a student at the Université de Montréal in the 1960s, he was codirector with Denys Arcand and Denis Héroux of the film Alone or With Others (Seul ou avec d'autres), for which he also composed music.

In 2011, Venne was the recipient of the Lifetime Achievement Award at the Francophone SOCAN Awards held in Montreal.

In 2016, Venne won the Cultural Impact Award for the song "Le début d'un temps nouveau" at the Francophone SOCAN Awards in Montreal.

Discography as singer-songwriter

 1964 : Stéphane Venne Volume 1 (Disques Sélect)
 1966 : Stéphane Venne Volume 2 (Disques Sélect)
 1967 : Un jour, un jour (Disques Sélect)
 1973 : Stéphane Venne en 10 chansons orchestrales (Barclay)
 1975 : Tranquillement Stéphane Venne (Les Disques Solset)
 1982 : Stéphane Venne (Disques Pro-Culture)
 1998 : Le temps est bon (Compilation) (Disques Citation)

Discography as songwriter for other artists

 1965 : Renée Claude - Il y eut un jour (Disques Sélect)
 1968 : Renée Claude - Renée Claude (C'est notre fête aujourd'hui) (Barclay)
 1969 : Donald Lautrec - un jour, un jour / Ces temps de jeunesse (select)
 1969 : Renée Claude - Le tour de la terre (Barclay)
 1970 : Renée Claude - Le début d'un temps nouveau (Barclay)
 1971 : Renée Claude - Tu trouveras la paix (Barclay)
 1971 : Pierre Lalonde - Inouik (Disques Capitol)
 1971 : Isabelle Pierre - Heureuse (Barclay)
 1972 : Isabelle Pierre - Le temps est bon (Barclay)
 1973 : Isabelle Pierre - Ballade pour Sergio Leone (Barclay)
 1973 : Perre Lalonde - A winnipeg les nuits sont longues 
 1973 : Pierre Lalonde - Honey, honey (Disques Victor)
 1973 : Emmanuëlle - Le monde à l'envers (Les Disques Solset)
 1974 : Emmanuëlle - Chanter pour vivre (Les Disques Solset)
 1975 : Emmanuëlle - Pas tout de suite, pas maintenant (Les Disques Solset)
 1976 : Emmanuëlle - La double compilation (Les Disques Solset)
 1976 : Suzanne Stevens - Moi, de la tête aux pieds (Capitol)
 1978 : Emmanuëlle - Je vous aime (Disques Solo)
 1979 : Renée Claude - Bonjour (Les Disques Solset)
 1979 : Suzanne Stevens - Les nuits sont trop longues (Capitol)
 1981 : Nicole Martin et l'Orchestre Montréal-Pop - "Les Plouffe", trame du film de Gilles Carle (Disques Pro-Culture)
 1989 : Nicole Martin - 20 ans d'amour, 20 chansons (Les Disques Diva)
 1993 : Emmanuëlle - Rétrospective (Disques Mérite)
 1997 : Pierre Lalonde - Succès de jeunesse (Disques Mérite)
 1997 : Isabelle Pierre - Les refrains d'abord (Fonovox)
 1997 : Isabelle Pierre - Collection Portrait (Fonovox)
 1998 : Renée Claude - C'était le début d'un temps nouveau (Disques Transit)
 1973 : Emmanuëlle - Et c'est pas fini (Disques Mérite)
 2001 : Nicole Martin - Mes grands succès Vol. 1 (Les Disques Diva)
 2003 : Star Académie 2003 - Et c'est pas fini (Disques Musicor)
 2004 : Marie-Élaine Thibert - Marie-Élaine Thibert (Disques Musicor)
 2004 : Isabelle Pierre - Compilation (Disques XXI-21)

References

External links
Biography in the Encyclopedia of Music in Canada - Stéphane Venne. Article by Anne-Marie Grégoire
Quebec Info Musique – Stéphane Venne

Canadian singer-songwriters
Canadian composers
Canadian male composers
French-language singers of Canada
1941 births
Living people
Best Original Song Genie and Canadian Screen Award winners
Canadian male singer-songwriters
Film directors from Quebec
Université de Montréal alumni